The Shepparton Swans Football Netball Club is an Australian rules football and netball club based in the city of Shepparton in northern Victoria. The club teams currently compete in the Goulburn Valley League.

History
The Shepparton Swans were originally known as the "Lemnos Football Club", named after the Greek island of the same name where some local Shepparton men were posted during World War I (the local area, originally known as 'Thomas Estate No. 5', became known as that from then on) and played in black and yellow jumpers.

The club would play in the Goulburn Valley Second Eighteens Football Association from its establishment in 1928 to 1936. The association's name was changed to the Goulburn Valley Football Association (GVFA) at the 1937 AGM (winning three premierships in this time: 1937, 1938, and 1940).

When the GVFA's title was changed to the Central Goulburn Valley Football League in 1946, Lemnos applied for admission into the newly formed league, but was refused. It also found that their colours were already being used by the Shepparton East Football Club, who joined the GVFA in 1945. As a result, the club applied for and entered the Goulburn Valley Football League in 1946. Being a town-based league, the club's name was changed to Lemnos-Shepparton. Again, the black and yellow colours were already in use (this time by the Rushworth Football Club). As a result, in 1946 the club took up the use of a white jumper with a red v (similar to the VFL team of South Melbourne at the time).

The first premiership the club won in this league was in 1959, beating Kyabram by 39 points.

In the 1960s a series of improvements led to the club moving from Deakin Reserve to Princess Park in Shepparton. It wasn't until 1970 that Lemnos-Shepparton won another premiership, again beating Kyabram (this time by 35 points).

In 1999, Lemnos-Shepparton formally adopted the new names of the Shepparton Swans, staying with this permanently.

Honours

Football Premierships

Football League – Best & Fairest winners
Seniors

Goulburn Valley Second Eighteens Football Association – N Gribble Cup

Lemnos
1934 – Paul Bell

Goulburn Valley Football League – Morrison Medal

Lemnos
 W Tyquin (1949)
 R Orrman (1951, 1954, 1959)
 N Smith (1975)
 M Lambourn (1996)

Shepparton Swans
 J Sutherland (2002)
 B Durbridge (2009)

World War II – Roll of Honour
The following four, former Lemnos FC players died in active duty during World War II.
 Paul Bell
 Stepper Hawkings
 George Pearce
 Ron Taylor

References

External links

Official website
1939 - Lemnos FC team photo

Australian rules football clubs in Victoria (Australia)
Sports clubs established in 1928
Australian rules football clubs established in 1928
1928 establishments in Australia
Goulburn Valley Football League clubs
Netball teams in Victoria (Australia)